The 1993 College Football All-America team is composed of college football players who were selected as All-Americans by various organizations and publications that chose College Football All-America Teams in 1993. It is an honor given annually to the best American college football players at their respective positions. 

The National Collegiate Athletic Association (NCAA) recognizes seven selectors as "official" for the 1993 season. They are: (1) the American Football Coaches Association (AFCA); (2) the Associated Press (AP) selected based on the votes of sports writers at AP newspapers; (3) Football News; (4) the Football Writers Association of America (FWAA); (4) The Sporting News; (6) the United Press International (UPI); and (7) the Walter Camp Football Foundation (WCFF).  Other notable selectors included Gannett News Service (GNS), Scripps Howard (SH), and the Newspaper Enterprise Association (NEA).

Ten players were unanimously selected as first-team All-Americans by all seven of the NCAA-recognized selectors.  They are: quarterback Charlie Ward of Florida State; running backs Marshall Faulk of San Diego State and LeShon Johnson of Northern Illinois; wide receiver J. J. Stokes of UCLA; center Jim Pyne of Virginia Tech; offensive tackle Aaron Taylor of Notre Dame; defensive tackle Rob Waldrop of Arizona; linebackers Trev Alberts of Nebraska and Derrick Brooks of Florida State; and defensive back Antonio Langham of Alabama. Charlie Ward also won the 1993 Heisman Trophy.

Offense

Quarterback
 Charlie Ward, Florida State (CFHOF) (AFCA, AP-1, FN, FWAA, TSN, UPI, WCFF, GNS, NEA-1, SH)
 Heath Shuler, Tennessee (AP-2, GNS, NEA-2)
 Trent Dilfer, Fresno State (AP-3, GNS)

Running backs

 Marshall Faulk, San Diego State (CFHOF) (AFCA, AP-1, FN, FWAA, TSN, UPI, WCFF, GNS, NEA-1, SH)
 LeShon Johnson, Northern Illinois (AFCA, AP-1, FN, FWAA, TSN, UPI, WCFF, GNS)
 Errict Rhett, Florida (FN, GNS)
 Tyrone Wheatley, Michigan (NEA-1, SH)
 Bam Morris, Texas Tech (AP-2, GNS)
 Brent Moss, Wisconsin (AP-2, NEA-2)
 Calvin Jones, Nebraska (AP-3, NEA-2)
 Napoleon Kaufman, Washington (AP-3)
 Charlie Garner, Tennessee (GNS)

Wide receivers
 J. J. Stokes, UCLA (AFCA, AP-1, FN, FWAA, TSN, UPI, WCFF, GNS, NEA-1, SH)
 Johnnie Morton, USC (AFCA, AP-1, FN, FWAA, TSN, GNS, NEA-2, SH)
 Ryan Yarborough, Wyoming (AP-1, FWAA, GNS, NEA-1)
 Charles Johnson, Colorado (AP-2, GNS, NEA-2 [KR])
 Chris Penn, Tulsa (AP-2)
 Bobby Engram, Penn State (AP-3)
 Joey Galloway, Ohio State (AP-3, GNS, NEA-2)

Tight end
 Pete Mitchell, Boston College (AP-2, TSN, UPI, SH)
 Carlester Crumpler, East Carolina (WCFF, NEA-2)
 Mark Bruener, Washington (AP-3, NEA-1)

Tackles

 Aaron Taylor, Notre Dame  (AFCA, AP-1, FN, FWAA, TSN, UPI, WCFF, GNS, NEA-1, SH)
 Wayne Gandy, Auburn (AP-1, FWAA, UPI, GNS, NEA-1, SH)
 Korey Stringer, Ohio State (AFCA, AP-2, WCFF, GNS, SH)
 Rich Braham, West Virginia (AFCA, AP-2, UPI, NEA-2)
 Todd Steussie, California (AFCA, AP-2, GNS)
 Marcus Spears, Northwestern State (FWAA, GNS, NEA-2)
 Bernard Williams, Georgia (FN, GNS, NEA-1)
 Joe Panos, Wisconsin (AP-2)
 Zach Wiegert, Nebraska (AP-3)
 Doug Skartvedt, Iowa State (AP-3)
 Vaughn Parker, UCLA (AP-3)
 Jeff Smith, Tennessee (AP-3)
 Reubin Brown, Pittsburgh (GNS)
 Jason Winrow, Ohio State (NEA-2)

Guards
 Mark Dixon, Virginia (AP-1, FN, FWAA, TSN, UPI, WCFF, NEA-1)
 Stacy Seegars, Clemson (AP-1, FN, TSN, WCFF, NEA-2, SH)

Center
 Jim Pyne, Virginia Tech (AFCA, AP-1, FN, FWAA, TSN, UPI, WCFF, NEA-1, SH)
 Tim Ruddy, Notre Dame (AP-2)
 Tom Nalen, Boston College (AP-3)
 K. C. Jones, Miami (NEA-2)

Defense

Linemen
 Rob Waldrop, Arizona (CFHOF) (AFCA, AP-1, FN, FWAA, TSN, UPI, WCFF, GNS, NEA-1, SH)
 Dan Wilkinson, Ohio State (AP-1, FN, FWAA, TSN, UPI, WCFF, GNS, NEA-1, SH)
 Sam Adams, Texas A&M (AFCA, AP-1, FN, TSN, UPI, WCFF, GNS, NEA-1, SH)
 Kevin Patrick, Miami (Fla.) (AFCA, AP-1, UPI, NEA-2)
 Shante Carver, Arizona State (FWAA, TSN, NEA-2)
 Derrick Alexander, Florida State (FWAA)
 Bryant Young, Notre Dame (AFCA, AP-2, GNS)
 Lou Benfatti, Penn State (AP-2, WCFF)
 Darren Krein, Miami (AP-2)
 Tedy Bruschi, Arizona (CFHOF) (AP-2)
 Derrick Alexander, Florida State (AP-3)
 William Gaines, Florida (AP-3)
 Lamark Shackerford, Wisconsin (AP-3, NEA-2)
 Henry Ford, Arkansas (AP-3)
 Kevin Mitchell, Syracuse (GNS)
 Joe Johnson, Louisville (GNS)
 Brentson Buckner, Clemson (NEA-1)
 Willie McGinest, USC (NEA-2)

Linebackers
 Trev Alberts, Nebraska (CFHOF) (AFCA [lineman], AP-1, FN, FWAA, TSN, UPI, WCFF, GNS, NEA-1, SH)
 Derrick Brooks, Florida State (CFHOF) (AFCA, AP-1, FN, FWAA, TSN, UPI, WCFF, GNS, NEA-1, SH)
 Jamir Miller, UCLA (AP-2, FN, TSN, UPI, WCFF, GNS, NEA-1)
 Dana Howard, Illinois (AFCA, AP-1, FN)
 Barron Wortham, UTEP (AP-2, FWAA, NEA-2, SH)
 Sean Harris, Arizona (AP-3, SH)
 Jerrott Willard, California (AP-2)
 DeWayne Dotson, Ole Miss (AP-3)
 Aubrey Beavers, Oklahoma (AP-3, GNS)
 John Thierry, Alcorn State (GNS, NEA-1)
 Marlo Perry, Jackson State (NEA-2)
 Anthony McClanahan, Washington State (NEA-2)
 Keith Burns, Oklahoma State (NEA-2)

Defensive backs
 Antonio Langham, Alabama (AFCA, AP-1, FN, FWAA, TSN, UPI, WCFF, GNS, NEA-1, SH)
 Aaron Glenn, Texas A&M (AFCA, AP-1, FWAA, TSN, UPI, WCFF, GNS, SH)
 Jeff Burris, Notre Dame (AP-1, FN, UPI, WCFF, NEA-1)
 Corey Sawyer, Florida State (AP-2, FN, TSN, UPI, WCFF, GNS)
 Jaime Mendez, Kansas St (AFCA, AP-1, FN)
 Bobby Taylor, Notre Dame (AP-3, FWAA, TSN, GNS, NEA-1, SH)
 Bracy Walker, North Carolina (AFCA, AP-2, FWAA, SH)
 Anthony Bridges, Louisville (AP-2)
 Thomas Randolph, Kansas State (AP-2)
 Dexter Seigler, Miami (AP-3)
 Chris Hudson, Colorado (AP-3, GNS)
 Orlando Thomas, Southwestern Louisiana (AP-3)
 Dewayne Washington, NC State (GNS)
 Anthony Phillips, Texas A&I (NEA-1)

Specialists

Placekicker
 Bjorn Merten, UCLA (AP-1, TSN, WCFF)
 John Becksvoort, Tennessee (FWAA, SH)
 John Stewart, SMU (AFCA)
 Michael Procter, Alabama (AP-2, FN)
 Judd Davis, Florida (AP-3, UPI, NEA-2)
 Pat O'Neal, Syracuse (GNS)
 Tommy Thompson, Oregon (NEA-1)

Punter
 Terry Daniel, Auburn (AFCA, AP-1, FN, FWAA, TSN, WCFF, GNS, NEA-1, SH)
 Chris MacInnis, Air Force (AP-2)
 Brad Faunce, UNLV (AP-3)

All-purpose / kick returners
 David Palmer, Alabama (AFCA [WR], AP-1 (all-purpose), FWAA [KR], UPI [KR], TSN [KR], WCFF [WR], GNS [WR], NEA-1 [KR])
 Leeland McElroy, Texas A&M (AP-2 (all-purpose))
 Andre Coleman, Kansas State (AP-3 (all-purpose))

Key
 Bold – Used for (1) consensus All-American and (2) first-team selections by an official selector
 CFHOF - Inducted into the College Football Hall of Fame
 -1 – First-team selection
 -2 – Second-team selection
 -3 – Third-team selection

Official selectors
 AFCA = American Football Coaches Association for Kodak
 AP = Associated Press
 FN = Football News
 FWAA = Football Writers Association of America
 TSN = The Sporting News
 UPI = United Press International
 WCFF = Walter Camp Football Foundation selected by NCAA Division I-A coaches and sports information directors

Other selectors
 GNS = Gannett News Service
 NEA = Newspaper Enterprise Association
 SH = Scripps Howard News Service

See also
 1993 All-Big Eight Conference football team
 1993 All-Big Ten Conference football team
 1993 All-Pacific-10 Conference football team
 1993 All-SEC football team

References

All-America Team
College Football All-America Teams